Brockway Motor Company was a builder of custom heavy-duty trucks in Cortland, New York, from 1912 to 1977. It was founded as Brockway Carriage Works in 1875 by William Brockway. His son George Brockway later turned the carriages into a truck manufacturer in 1909. The first trucks were high-wheelers. During World War I Brockway built 587 Class B Liberty Trucks for the military. After the war they started a new range from 1-ton to 5-tons. They began with Continental engines but switched to Wisconsin in 1925. They bought the Indiana Truck Corporation in 1928 but were forced to sell it to White Motor Company in the early years of the depression. A new range, the V1200 was offered from 1934 to 1937. The V1200 used a 240 horsepower V12 American LaFrance engine and carried loads up to 15 tons.

During World War II Brockway manufactured the B666 heavy truck, including the B666 Daybrook M-II-A bridge erector and C666 Quick Way crane, as well as G547 and G690 6-ton 6×6 bridging trucks, part of a standard design series also built by Corbitt and White. G547 "Treadway" trucks had a large hoist on the rear for self-unloading, while the G690 chassis were fitted with "Quickway" cranes, also used in bridging operations.

The company was purchased by Mack Trucks Inc. in August 1956 and remained a division of Mack until its closing in June 1977. Mack cited "union troubles" for the closure.

Brockway commercial trucks primarily used Cummins engines, though many were powered by Detroit Diesels. Some Brockway trucks were equipped with inline six engines fitted with Rochester 2G (DualJet) carburetors.

There is a Brockway Truck show in Cortland each year with many events occurring at the official Brockway Museum located in Homer, NY at the Central New York Living History Center.  

The hood ornament used by Brockway was a husky dog with pulling harness, thus giving Cortland the nickname of "Huskie Town USA".

A documentary about the trucks and the Brockway company is available from Wiffle Ball Productions in Cortland, New York.

References

External links

 Brockway Truck Preservation Association

Defunct truck manufacturers of the United States
Motor vehicle manufacturers based in New York (state)
Defunct motor vehicle manufacturers of the United States
Vehicle manufacturing companies established in 1912
Companies disestablished in 1977
1912 establishments in New York (state)
Mack Trucks
Defunct manufacturing companies based in New York (state)
1956 mergers and acquisitions